The 1952 South Dakota gubernatorial election was held on November 4, 1952.

Incumbent Republican Governor Sigurd Anderson was re-elected, defeating Democratic nominee Sherman A. Iverson with 70.15% of the vote.

Primary elections
Primary elections were held on June 3, 1952.

Democratic primary

Candidates
Sherman A. Iverson, Mayor of South Sioux Falls

Results

Republican primary

Candidates
Sigurd Anderson, incumbent Governor

Results

General election

Candidates
Sherman A. Iverson, Democratic
Sigurd Anderson, Republican

Results

References

Bibliography
 

1952
South Dakota
Gubernatorial
November 1952 events in the United States